Jackie is a 2016 biographical drama film directed by Pablo Larraín and written by Noah Oppenheim. Starring Natalie Portman, the film focuses on Jacqueline "Jackie" Kennedy's life before and after the 1963 assassination of her husband John F. Kennedy. The film had its world premiere at the Venice Film Festival on September 7, 2016 and was released to theaters on December 2, 2016. The film was released to universal acclaim, with Rotten Tomatoes gave an approval rating of 89%, based on 265 reviews, with an average rating of 7.9/10 and Metacritic gave a score of 81 out of 100, based on 52 reviews.

Jackie received three nominations at Academy Awards, including Best Actress for Portman, Best Costume Design and Best Original Score. At the British Academy Film Awards, the film won Best Costume Design, with Portman receiving a nomination for Best Actress and the film’s composer receiving a nomination for Best Original Music The film won Best Actress for Portman, Best Costume Design and Best Hair and Makeup and nominated for Best Cinematography, Best Art Direction and Best Score at Critics' Choice Awards. Portman was nominated for Best Actress – Motion Picture Drama at Golden Globe Awards. The film won Best Costume Design and nominated for Best Film, Best Director, Best Actress and Best Art Direction and Production Design at Satellite Awards.

Accolades

Notes

References

External links 
 

Lists of accolades by film